Big Bad World is the fifth studio album by American rock band Plain White T's. It was released on September 23, 2008, by Hollywood Records. The creation of this album was a follow up album to Every Second Counts in hopes of breaking free from being the "Hey There Delilah" Band. To promote the album, the Plain White T's launched a few webisodes, which together form the series Meet Me in California. The majority of the album was written while on the road, in planes, in hotels, and on buses.

Production 
The producer of this album, Johnny K, and mixer Andy Wallace approached the recordings as if it were an old recording. Typically, a recording studio would "layer the guitars," by recording everyone separately. Instead, Tom Higgenson revealed his ultimate goal: that he would rather the band "reflect back onto The Beatles to 'bring that back- the real songs, the classic kind of feel.'" Both producers decided to let the "ambiance of the room fill out the recording rather than layer the performances." To produce this kind of sound, the album was recorded in one room with the P.A. monitors and wedges, and no headphones. They even decided to use live drum recordings, rather than fiddling with the artificial sounds of an electric set.

Promotion
The clothing store Aéropostale started selling the album. Buying it from there includes a limited edition Plain White T's T-shirt; also trying on a pair of jeans there gets you a code to type on Aeropostale's website for a free song download titled "Love at 10th Sight". This was also done with the latest Fall Out Boy album to increase awareness of the Aero brand. The free download is no longer available due to it being limited until midnight of the album release.

The single "Natural Disaster" is featured as downloadable content for the Rock Band series.
 Natural Disaster
 Hey There Delilah
 Hate (I Really Don't Like You)
 Our Time Now
 Making Of 'Big Bad World'
 UK Tour Footage
 Making Of 'Natural Disaster'
 Rodders

Critical reception

The album received mixed reviews, with The Album Project giving the album a score of 2/5 and saying; "the new Plain White T's seem to be making music with the intention of not simply becoming a one hit wonder ("Hey There Delilah") and "making it big" but in the process have watered down everything." AbsolutePunk.net reviewer Chris Fallon gave the album a score of only 24%, saying "the band continues their steep decline by writing some of the cheesiest, most gimmicky songs even Kidz Bop wouldn't consider covering". AbsolutePunk later lampooned the record by claiming that album had sold 10 million copies, as their April Fool's Day joke of 2009.

However, the album also gained a positive reception from critics. AllMusic reviewer Andrew Leahey gave the album 3 and-a-half out of 5 stars, saying "the[y] [Plain White T's] never attempt to recreate the magic that fueled "Hey There Delilah," focusing instead on slick, sunny songcraft with nary an acoustic guitar in sight," calling it "a refreshingly smart release that emphasizes the band's pop/rock leanings" and that they "deserve points for remaining grounded after a meteoric year."

Track listing
All songs written by Tom Higgenson except for when noted

Personnel
Credits adapted from the album's liner notes.

Plain White T's
 Tom Higgenson – lead vocals, piano , harmonica 
 Tim Lopez – lead guitar, backing vocals, co-lead vocals 
 Dave Tirio – rhythm guitar
 Mike Retondo – bass guitar, bass clarinet , melodica , coronet , saxophone , backing vocals
 De'Mar Hamilton – drums, percussion

Additional musicians
 Johnny K – slide guitar , mellotron 
 William Hamilton – organ 
 Matt Harris – screamed vocals 
 Eric Remschneider – strings 
 Ian Kirkpatrick – horn arrangements 
 Jon Brion – Chamberlin 

Production
 Justin Wilk – assistant engineering, digital editing
 Daniel Salcido – 2nd assistant engineer
 Andy Wallace – mixing
 John O'Mahony – mix engineer
 Jan Petrov – mix assistant
 Ted Jensen – mastering

Artwork
 David Snow – creative direction
 Enny Joo – art direction and design
 Jesse Frohman – photography

References

2008 albums
Plain White T's albums
Hollywood Records albums
Fearless Records albums
Albums produced by Johnny K